A deadly tornado outbreak occurred in Central Texas during the afternoon and evening of May 27, 1997, in conjunction with a southwestward-moving cluster of supercell thunderstorms. These storms produced 20 tornadoes, mainly along the Interstate 35 corridor from northeast of Waco to north of San Antonio. The strongest tornado was an F5 tornado that leveled parts of Jarrell, killing 27 people and injuring 12 others. Overall, 30 people were killed and 33 others were hospitalized by the severe weather.

Although the atmospheric conditions enabling the event were forecast to be conducive for strong winds and large hail, forecasters did not initially anticipate as much of a risk of strong tornadoes due to the lack of substantial wind shear over the region. Instead, the coalescence of several weather features—including a cold front, a dry line, and a gravity wave—provided locally favorable conditions for rotating thunderstorms and the formation of tornadoes. This peculiar evolution led to the unusual southwestward motion of the storms and the tornadoes they produced.

A tornado watch was first issued at 12:54 p.m. on May 27 for portions of East Texas and western Louisiana; the first tornado touched down at 1:21 p.m. in McLennan County while the final tornado lifted at 8:23 p.m. later that day in Frio County. The 20 tornadoes collectively inflicted at least $126.6 million in damage. The F5 Jarrell tornado was the outbreak's most powerful and deadliest tornado. It destroyed most of the 38-home Double Creek Estates subdivision west of Jarrell where the most extreme damage occurred. Residences were completely dismantled, swept away, and reduced to a concrete slab, while trees in the area were completely shredded and debarked. Due to the tornado's intensity, the debris was often small in size and beyond recognition. There were four other tornadoes rated F3 or higher. One F3 tornado moved across Cedar Park, damaging parts of the business district and numerous homes in nearby neighborhoods. An F4 tornado struck areas near Lake Travis and caused one fatality. In addition to the tornadoes, the storms also produced large hail and strong straight-line winds; Kelly Air Force Base in San Antonio recorded a  wind gust.

Meteorological synopsis

Atmospheric setup 

The severity of the 1997 Central Texas tornado outbreak was predicated on an unusual spatial and temporal alignment of weather features at highly localized scales. The broader environment was not particularly anomalous for the late springtime over Central and East Texas. Unlike conventional tornado outbreaks in Texas, the 1997 outbreak was not associated with a strong trough of low pressure and strong density gradients in the lower troposphere. Instead, the most prominent weather system over the central U.S. at the time was a distant upper-level low centered over Nebraska imparting little influence on atmospheric conditions over Texas.

Consequently, winds in the mid-levels of the troposphere over Texas on May 27 were weak and westerly, ranging from 30 kts (35 mph, 55 km/h) over North Texas to below 15 kts (20 mph, 30 km/h) over Central and South Texas. Winds closer to the surface were also quiescent; the average storm-relative winds within the lowest  of the atmosphere as measured in Del Rio, Texas, prior to the onset of storm development was only 6 kts (7 mph, 11 km/h). Further aloft at the level of the jet stream, there were two nearby wind speed maxima over northern Mexico and the central Mississippi Valley; this led to strong divergence of air over Texas. Wind shear was negligible within the lowest  of the atmosphere contrary to typical tornado outbreaks.

Despite generally meager winds, the atmosphere was nonetheless thermally energetic. The combination of several days of onshore wind flow from the Gulf of Mexico and the persistence of a capping inversion aloft led to an accumulation of moist air over the state. Dew points soon exceeded  within the boundary layer, representing ample moisture in the lower levels of the troposphere. Radiosondes launched from Corpus Christi and Fort Worth on the morning of May 27 detected the presence of a robust "elevated mixed layer" of air aloft characterized by steep lapse rates—the change of temperature with height—near the dry adiabatic lapse rate. This contributed to high convective available potential energy (CAPE) exceeding 5,500 J/kg across most of Central and East Texas, denoting a highly unstable atmosphere. In some cases CAPE was as high as 6,500 J/kg. The lack of fronts moving across Texas in the 36 hours before the tornado outbreak allowed this instability to remain and spread across much of the state.

Although these conditions were regionally conducive to the development of thunderstorms capable of producing large hail and strong winds, the potential for supercell and tornado development was not initially clear given the lack of wind shear. Other metrics and indices used to diagnose tornado potential, such as the Energy Helicity Index, storm-relative helicity, supercell composite parameter, and the significant tornado parameter, were also lower than historically observed environments featuring tornadoes. For instance, the amount of storm-relative helicity within the lowest  of the atmosphere—a common measure quantifying the amount of wind shear—was measured as 70 m2/s2 at Corpus Christi and reached 117 m2/s2 according to data from the Rapid Update Cycle computer model; values below 300 m2/s2 are correlated with weak tornadoes. A study published in Monthly Weather Review in 2007 described the environment as being "marginally favorable for supercells and unfavorable for significant, supercellular tornadoes."

Instead, the factors that enabled the eventual tornado outbreak may have transpired at a mesoscale involving several features becoming juxtaposed over Texas. The dry line delineating the boundary between the moist maritime airmass over East Texas and the drier continental airmass farther west remained nearly stationary in the region through the morning of May 27. On the preceding evening, a mesoscale convective system developing along this dry line over eastern Oklahoma and Arkansas generated a well-defined gravity wave that traveled southwest across East Texas on the morning of May 27. Its progression was evidenced on satellite imagery as an advancing band of mid-level cumuli. A weak low-pressure area also developed along the dry line near Dallas and tracked southwest along the boundary. In the two days before May 27, a cold front associated with the upper-level low over Nebraska had swept slowly southeast across the central U.S. Prior to dawn on May 27, the front progressed across West Texas; by 7:00 a.m. on May 27, the front spanned from southeastern Oklahoma through the northwestern portion of the Dallas–Fort Worth metroplex southwestwards to near the Big Bend of Texas. This placed the cold front parallel and just to the west of the dry line along a northeast to southwest orientation. A swath of clear skies emerged between the two boundaries, maximizing surface heating during the daytime and contributing to the weak low-pressure area's southwestward movement through Central Texas.

Development of storms 

At around 12:30 p.m., the gravity wave, cold front, dry line, and low-pressure area overlapped near Waco, Texas, with the faster cold front overtaking and merging with the nearly stationary dry line. The cold front and dry line were brought together in a northeast to southwest fashion resembling a zipper. Thunderstorms formed near Waco in tandem with this juxtaposition of features and within a local maximum of surface heating and convergence of moist air. While some storms had spawned along the cold front, the gravity wave's passage in the early afternoon hours coincided with a rapid intensification of the first thunderstorms. The arrival of the gravity wave and its perpendicular alignment relative to the orientation of the cold front and dry line may have enhanced wind shear locally despite weak wind shear at a broader, synoptic scale. This allowed the thunderstorms to rotate and become supercells.

However, the degree to which the wave contributed to the formation of supercells and eventually tornadoes remains a subject of disagreement among meteorologists. The development of new discrete supercells followed the advancing intersection of the cold front and dry line and the gravity wave as they continued southwest, though each individual storm was nearly stationary. Due to the westerly winds in the mid-levels of the troposphere, the outflow from each developing storm was directed east, allowing each new thunderstorm to develop and rotate without interference from the initial storms. The direction of the storms' expansion towards the southwest deviated over 100 degrees away from these westerly winds, representing an extreme and highly unusual motion. The southwestward generation of storms brought them towards increasingly unstable air with higher CAPE, allowing the storms to acquire strong inflow and the requisite rotation to produce tornadoes.

There were at least three families of thunderstorms that developed as part of the initial southwestward-moving complex of storms, composed of at least 16 distinct supercells; six of the cells formed along the cold front, five formed along the dry line, and five formed along the gust front imparted by previous storms. The gust fronts pushed outwards by the downdrafts of the thunderstorms served as foci for tornadogenesis; boundaries like gust fronts can provide low-level vorticity and rising air necessary for the formation of tornadoes. Some of the day's tornadoes were spun up by the gust front itself while others spawned from thunderstorms with preexisting mesocyclones aloft enhanced by the gust front underneath.

The day's first thunderstorm near Waco in McLennan County strengthened quickly in response to the highly unstable atmosphere. A severe thunderstorm warning—the first of the day—was issued for the county at 12:50 p.m. Weather radars showed increasing rotation within the storm, prompting the issuance of a tornado warning at 1:21 p.m. This storm produced the outbreak's first tornado  of southwest of Hewitt near Lorena. The same storm produced a second brief tornado near Bruceville followed by a third, intense F3 tornado in southwestern McLennan County that lasted for 20 minutes. A new thunderstorm developed along the flanking line associated with the first storm. This second storm spawned several tornadoes as it expanded towards the southwest, including an F3 tornado near Lake Belton beginning at 2:25 p.m. and the F5 Jarrell tornado beginning at 3:25 p.m. The NEXRAD radar in Granger used to monitor this storm suffered a power failure and went out of commission at 3:38 p.m. A control switch left in an improper position on a prior maintenance visit prevented its emergency power supply from activating. Thunderstorms developing to the southwest later in the afternoon and evening produced additional tornadoes, including the F3 tornado that struck Cedar Park and the F4 tornado that struck Lakeway. The Lakeway tornado was the first instance of an F4 tornado striking Travis County on record. The final tornado of the day touched down in Frio County and lifted at 7:23 p.m.

Farther south away from the southwestward-moving storm cluster, the cold front and dry line curved west, making them parallel to the advancing gravity wave; this triggered the development of numerous and intense storms between Austin and the Big Bend after 3:00 p.m. when the gravity wave intersected the front. The parallel orientations of the wave and the other boundaries precluded these storms' rotation. They tracked east and eventually merged with the southwestward-propagating complex of tornadic storms along the Pedernales River. This coalescence produced a south- and southeastward-moving squall line and ended the strong tornado activity. Nonetheless, strong and damaging winds were produced by the squall line for several hours. Kelly Air Force Base in San Antonio documented a wind gust of 106 kt (122 mph, 196 km/h), marking a record high wind velocity for the site.

Warnings and preparedness 
The Storm Prediction Center (SPC) forecasted a moderate risk for severe thunderstorms over parts of East Texas in its severe weather outlook issued at 1:03 a.m. on May 27. The moderate risk region included Waco, the Killeen–Temple–Fort Hood metropolitan area, and extended east towards Shreveport, Louisiana, and Fort Polk, Louisiana. Austin was located at the boundary between the moderate risk region and the slight risk region that encompassed most of East and South Texas, including the Hill Country. The SPC predicted that the gravity wave would be a focal point for storms capable of producing large hail and damaging winds given the unstable atmosphere. A subsequent outlook issued by the SPC at 10:16 a.m. continued to indicate a moderate risk for severe weather and mentioned the possibility of isolated and brief tornadoes. A tornado watch was later issued by the SPC at 12:54 p.m. for parts of eastern Texas and western Louisiana, citing the unstable airmass in place over the region. The Dallas/Fort Worth and Austin/San Antonio National Weather Service forecast offices also issued bulletins on the morning of May 27 noting the potential for severe weather. However, these early outlooks focused more on the threat of wind and hail rather than tornadoes due to the low wind shear present over the region.

The Dallas/Fort Worth National Weather Service forecast office ultimately issued 10 tornado warnings and 5 severe thunderstorm warnings between 1 and 5 p.m. on May 27. The Austin/San Antonio office issued 8 tornado warnings, 24 severe thunderstorm warnings, and 10 flash flood warnings during the afternoon and evening of May 27, with 80 percent of their issued products occurring after 5 p.m. in connection with the widespread storms that developed later in the day separate from the initial tornadic storms. In one case, a media outlet's decision to manually activate the Emergency Alert System rather than allow weather warnings to automatically trigger it resulted in a 25–30 minute delay in the dissemination of a warning. Interviews conducted by a National Oceanic and Atmospheric Administration service assessment team found that many watched the approach of tornadoes prior to taking shelter due to their slow movement and high visibility. In the case of the F5 Jarrell tornado, some fled while others took shelter. Due to the strength of the tornado, some who stayed behind were killed despite taking appropriate safety measures.

Confirmed tornadoes

Jarrell, Texas

Parts of Jarrell, Texas, were struck by a powerful F5 tornado on the afternoon of May 27. The tornado destroyed approximately 10 percent of the homes in Jarrell; at the time, the city had a population of about 450 people and had been previously struck by tornadoes in 1987 and 1989. Hardest-hit was the Double Creek Estates subdivision west of downtown Jarrell. The 1997 Jarrell tornado was the first and only known occurrence of an F5 tornado in Williamson County. It was also the deadliest tornado in Texas since the 1987 Saragosa tornado. The thunderstorm that spawned the Jarrell tornado began west of Temple along the flanking line of another thunderstorm earlier in the afternoon of May 27. The storm produced several tornadoes in Bell County, including the F3 tornado that impacted communities along Lake Belton. Weather radar observed a strengthening mesocyclone within the thunderstorm, with the speed of rotation rising above 40 kts (45 mph, 75 km/h). As the storm moved into Williamson County, it produced two short-lived F2 tornadoes north of Jarrell at 3:25 p.m. and 3:35 p.m.; the latter of the two was a multiple-vortex tornado and lifted at 3:39 p.m. The Austin/San Antonio National Weather Service forecast office issued a tornado warning for Williamson County at 3:30 p.m. in response to the storm's approach; the warning was put into effect for one hour. This was the first tornado warning of the day issued for the office's warning area and warned that "the city of Jarrell is in the path of this storm." Local warning sirens went off about 10–12 minutes before the tornado struck.

The precise start of the Jarrell tornado was difficult to pinpoint. The most prominent and destructive part of the tornado's evolution was preceded by the apparition of short-lived, small, and rope-like funnel clouds. These may have been separate tornadoes or simply an earlier part of the Jarrell tornado's evolution. An aerial survey conducted by the Birmingham, Alabama, office of the National Weather Service included the damage caused by the earlier F2 tornadoes—mostly to trees and roads—as part of the overall Jarrell tornado path. Some reports also include the F1 tornado near Prairie Dell as an earlier continuation of the Jarrell tornado. Like the two F3 tornadoes earlier in the day, it developed along the gust front produced by its parent thunderstorm. This mechanism is typical of tornadogenesis not associated with supercell thunderstorms. Traffic along Interstate 35 came to a stop as the tornado descended nearby. The Texas Highway Patrol also stopped traffic on both sides of the interstate under the expectation that the tornado would cross the highway; it ultimately moved parallel to Interstate 35. F5 tornado damage was identified early in the tornado's path. Its intense winds scoured the ground and stripped pavement from roads. The tornado tore  of asphalt as it crossed County Roads 308, 305, and 307; the thickness of the asphalt pavement was roughly 0.8 inches (20 mm). A culvert plant at the corner of Country Roads 305 and 307 collapsed. Nearby, a similar plant and mobile home sustained some damage, with the latter struck by a 2×4 piece of lumber.

The tornado then slowly entered the Double Creek Estates subdivision where it exacted its most catastrophic impacts. The tornado destroyed the first home it encountered on the northwestern corner of the subdivision; a clock recovered from the remaining debris was stopped at 3:48 p.m., presumably marking the time the tornado entered the community. Much of the neighborhood was leveled and reduced to small and unrecognizable debris, with the resulting rubble lacking any large items; the granularity of the debris was indicative of the sheer strength of the twister. Due to the tornado's slow movement, homes near the center of its path experienced tornadic winds for approximately three minutes. The mostly wooden-framed residences were completely removed from their foundations, leaving behind cement slab foundations swept clear of wreckage. In some cases, parts of the foundations themselves were extruded, including the sill plates that connected the wood-frame homes to the foundations. Portions of the remaining rubble were dispersed miles away. Vehicles in the neighborhood were tossed and mangled beyond recognition; at least six were found flattened in open areas and coated with mud and grass. Trees in the neighborhood were completely denuded of their bark.

All 27 fatalities associated with the Jarrell tornado occurred at Double Creek Estates, which at the time consisted of 131 residents living in 38 single-family homes and several mobile homes. Bodily remains were later found at 30 locations. Most of the deaths were attributed in the Morbidity and Mortality Weekly Report to multiple trauma, though one death was attributed to asphyxia. The high intensity of the Jarrell tornado left those in its path with little recourse; most homes in Double Creek Estates were built on cement slab foundations and few had a basement or any form of storm shelter; nineteen people sought refuge in a single storm cellar. Some residents who followed prescribed safety measures nonetheless perished. One survivor holed up in a bathtub and was flung several hundred feet from her house onto a road. The walls of some homes along the periphery of the tornado path remained intact, protecting some of those who survived the tornado. Others chose to evacuate ahead of the approaching tornado. Forty structures were obliterated in Double Creek Estates. Three businesses adjacent to Double Creek Estates were destroyed. In total, the tornado dealt $10–20 million in damage to the neighborhood. Hundreds of cattle were also dismembered and a few cows were also skinned by the tornado.

The tornado turned slightly towards the south-southwest after traversing Double Creek Estates. The damage in these outlying areas was somewhat scattershot; in one case, a mobile home suffered only minor damage while an adjacent house lost half of its roof. Metal buildings were unroofed along County Road 305 south of Jarrell. The road's guardrail was impaled by wooden planks thrown by the strong winds. The tornado then again crossed County Road 305 and entered a forest of cedar trees. Some of the damage to the trees suggested that the tornado may have been a multiple-vortex tornado, which was documented by storm chasers, receiving a nickname as a “dead man walking”. Other government accounts of the tornado list a total path length of  after incorporating the preceding tornadoes north of Jarrell and near Prairie Dell. Between May 29 and June 1, the Office of the Federal Coordinator for Meteorological Services and Supporting Research carried out aerial and ground surveys of the tornadic damage in Texas in coordination with the Texas Wing Civil Air Patrol. The Jarrell tornado damage was classified as F5 severity throughout most of the tornado's path. The critique noted that the homes at Double Creek Estates, although built within the preceding 15 years, exhibited structural weaknesses in their design such as the lack of anchor bolts and steel straps in their foundations. Approximately $40 million in damage was inflicted upon property with another $100,000 inflicted upon crops. Twelve people were injured by the storm in addition to the twenty-seven killed.

Due to the unusual southwestward motion of the thunderstorm that caused the tornado, the sequence of weather events experienced by those affected was in the opposite order of typical tornadic events: the tornado arrived first, followed by the hail, wind, and rain of the parent thunderstorm. Despite the violence of the tornado and the presence of its associated mesocyclone aloft, the thunderstorm did not exhibit a distinct hook echo on weather radar typically associated with such tornadoes. This may have also been caused by the unusual southwestward motion of the thunderstorm, resulting in the tornado's placement in an atypical position relative to the thunderstorm's motion.

Non-tornadic effects 
In addition to the tornadoes, there were 12 reports of large hail in Central Texas received by the National Weather Service during the late afternoon and evening. Damaging hail was also reported in Georgetown beginning at 3:55 p.m. Severe thunderstorms also generated damaging straight-line winds across the Hill Country and South-Central Texas. Much of these winds were associated with the eventual, non-tornadic line of storms that resulted from the coalescence of the day's earlier storms. Gusts reached  in Del Rio and overturned a plane at an airport near Seguin. The storms knocked out power to 60,000 electricity customers in Austin and as many as 21,000 electricity customers serviced by Texas Utilities. Telephone service for more than 3,000 residents in the Pedernales Valley was disrupted. The thunderstorms also produced heavy rain that triggered floods in Blanco, Gonzales, Karnes, and Travis counties. The rains caused Brushy Creek to flood beyond its banks as far east as Thorndale. One person drowned in floodwaters along Shoal Creek in Austin. Another person died in Cedar Park of cardiac arrest likely induced by storm-related stress. The Southwestern Insurance Information Service estimated that the totality of the storms' effects inflicted $25–40 million in insured losses; most insured claims originated from Cedar Park.

Aftermath 

Law enforcement officers from the Texas Department of Public Safety, four municipal police departments, and two county sheriff's offices aided search-and-rescue efforts in the aftermath of the Jarrell tornado. The Texas National Guard and other volunteers from around Central Texas joined in the search. The Scott & White Blood Center facilitated blood donations. A temporary shelter was established by the American Red Cross at Jarrell High School for those displaced by the tornado, providing food and accepting clothes donations. The agency's relief operations, covering residents of 211 homes, cost an estimated $250,000; community donations covered at least $200,000 of the expenses. The Jarrell Volunteer Fire Department organized a temporary morgue; the deceased were later brought to the Travis County Forensic Center for identification. Although a death toll of 30 people was initially reported, that figure was later revised to 27; the inflated count was attributed to the dispersion of remains that led some fatalities to be tallied twice. Carcasses of livestock were buried at Double Creek Estates.

Texas Governor George W. Bush declared Williamson County a disaster area; Bush visited Jarrell on May 28 and described the tornadic damage as the worst he had ever witnessed. U.S. Senator Kay Bailey Hutchison also visited Jarrell and Cedar Park. Bush later requested federal aid for Williamson and Bell counties with support from Hutchinson. The Federal Emergency Management Agency elected not to provide federal aid, citing the contributions from private and state sources. Instead, the Small Business Administration and U.S. Department of Agriculture made available loans for the rebuilding of homes, farms, and ranches. The U.S. Congress approved a relief bill allocating $5.4 billion for 35 states affected by natural disasters, including Texas. However, the bill also included other provisions that led President Bill Clinton to veto the bill. A drive-through donation line was established at Auditorium Shores in Austin. Local musicians organized and performed at a benefit concert at Austin Music Hall, attracting an audience of 2,800 and raising about $94,000. Businesses also donated to the relief efforts.

First responders representing Cedar Park, Austin, Leander, Round Rock, and Williamson and Travis counties arrived in Cear Park shortly after the city was hit by a tornado. Texas A&M University supplied equipment for search-and-rescue operations in the aftermath of the Cedar Park tornado. These operations were the first test of the 186-member Texas Urban Search and Rescue Team, which was created following the 1995 Oklahoma City bombing. Vouchers were distributed by the American Red Cross to storm victims in the Buttercup Creek subdivision for clothing, food, and other supplies. Texas State Troopers blocked areas of Buttercup Creek to prevent looting.

A memorial was erected in downtown Jarrell bearing the names of the 27 people killed by the Jarrell tornado. The Jarrell Memorial Park was established near Double Creek Estates on the land of the former Igo family, who perished in the tornado. The park contains 27 trees planted in honor of the victims. In 2019, the memorial was relocated to the park along with the city's historical marker. The events and survivor accounts of the tornado were profiled in television documentaries such as the 1999 episode of HBO's America Undercover series titled "Fatal Twisters: A Season of Fury", the 1999 BBC television series titled Twister Week (also known as Tornado Diary in the United States) in an episode titled "Tornado Alley", the seventh episode of the Discovery Channel program Storm Warning, produced by GRB Entertainment, and the 2006 documentary Ultimate Disaster (also known as Mega Disaster) on National Geographic Channel.

See also

 List of North American tornadoes and tornado outbreaks
 1922 Austin twin tornadoes – also featured southwestward-tracking tornadoes that struck the Austin, Texas, area
 Tornado outbreak of April 6–9, 1998 – produced the official first F5 tornado after the Jarrell tornado
 1953 Waco tornado – the deadliest tornado in Texas history

Notes

References

Bibliography

External links 
 Aerial Damage Survey of the Central Texas Tornadoes of May 27, 1997 (PDF) (National Weather Service), includes discussion and map of the tornado's track
 Texas Tornadoes (National Climatic Data Center)
 Satellite imagery (University of Wisconsin–Madison)
 Stormtrack Magazine Nov/Dec 1997: Jarrell, Texas Tornado Expanded Edition (PDF)

F5 tornadoes
Tornadoes of 1997
Tornadoes in Texas
Central Texas Tornado Outbreak, 1997
May 1997 events in the United States